Antonio Toledo may refer to:

 Antonio Toledo (footballer) (1912-2003), Salvadoran footballer
 Estadio Antonio Toledo Valle, Salvadoran stadium named after the footballer
 Antonio Toledo Corro (1919-2012), Mexican politician
 Antônio Toledo Filho (born 1953), Brazilian rower